Deepwater River, a mostly perennial stream of the Dumaresq-Macintyre catchment within the Murray–Darling basin, is located in the Northern Tablelands district of New South Wales, Australia.

The river rises on the western slopes of the Great Dividing Range, near Old Man Gibber, east of Deepwater, and flows generally north northwest, west, and then west, before reaching its confluence with Bluff River to form the Mole River, near Sandy Flat; descending  over its  course.

See also
 Rivers of New South Wales
 List of rivers of Australia

References

External links
 

Rivers of New South Wales
Murray-Darling basin